Ryan Ha (born 24 August 1997) is a French professional footballer who plays as winger for V.League 1 club Khánh Hòa.

Career
Born in France, Ryan Ha is of Vietnamese and French descent. During his teenage years, Ryan Ha played for local clubs before training at the Edusport Academy in Glasgow, Scotland for a season. Aftermath, he mainly played for the clubs of the French 5th division National 3.

In 2022, Ha went to Vietnam for a trial at the newly promoted V.League 1 team Khánh Hòa. After a good performance in pre season friendly tournaments, he was registered by Khanh Hoa to their 2023 V.League 1 squad list as their unnaturalized Vietnamese player slot. Ryan Ha made his professional debut with Khanh Hoa in a 1–0 V.League 1 loss to Thanh Hóa on 3 January 2023. He score his first goal in V.League 1 against Ho Chi Minh City FC.

Style of play

Ha can operate as a midfielder and is known for his powerful long shots.

References

External links

1997 births
Living people
French footballers
Sportspeople of Vietnamese descent
French people of Vietnamese descent
Footballers from Paris
Association football wingers
Championnat National 3 players
V.League 1 players
Khanh Hoa FC players